Chigwell is a London Underground station in the town of Chigwell in the Epping Forest district of Essex. It is located on the Hainault Loop of the Central line, between Grange Hill and Roding Valley stations.

History

The station was opened on 1 May 1903 by the Great Eastern Railway (GER) on its Woodford to Ilford line (the Fairlop Loop). As a consequence of the 1921 Railways Act, the GER was merged with other railway companies in 1923 to become part of the London & North Eastern Railway (LNER).

The Woodford to Ilford loop was largely integrated into the London Underground Central line as part of the London Passenger Transport Board's New Works Programme of 1935 - 1940, which saw an extension of electric tube services into north-east London. As part of this work the station closed on 29 November 1947. Electric Underground trains served the station from 21 November 1948.

From the mid-1960s until the early 1990s the Woodford-Hainault section was largely operated separately from the rest of the Central line, using four-car (later three-car) trains of 1960 Stock. The three car units had a 1938 tube stock middle carriage. These trains were adapted for Automatic Train Operation (ATO): the Woodford-Hainault section became the testing ground for ATO on the Victoria line. Some Victoria line (1967 Stock) trains were also used to operate this section and named FACT, "Fully Automatic Controlled Train". The separate operation has now been abolished, the 1960 Stock has been withdrawn and through trains to Central London now operate via Hainault. Because of this, it is normally quicker to travel to Woodford and change there, as trains to central London run frequently from that point. At the buildup to the peak periods, some trains starting from Hainault depot operate to central London via Grange Hill, Chigwell, Roding Valley and Woodford. This is done for operating convenience but passenger demand for these services is particularly high.

The station today

The station went through refurbishment, which was completed in 2006.

Services
In view of the rising passenger numbers, the train service on this branch was extended to midnight in 2006. (Previously it stopped at 20:00.) The typical off-peak service in trains per hour (tph) is:
3 tph to Hainault
3 tph to Woodford

At morning rush hour, there are three trains that run to West Ruislip.

Connections
London Bus routes 167 and school routes 667 serve the station. Local Bus route 804 and Local School route 53 also serve the station.

Filming location
The station is used as a location in Mike Leigh's 1983 film Meantime.

References

External links

 London Transport Museum Photographic Archive
 

Central line (London Underground) stations
Tube stations in Essex
Transport in Epping Forest District
Former Great Eastern Railway stations
Railway stations in Great Britain opened in 1903
Buildings and structures in Chigwell
William Neville Ashbee railway stations
1903 establishments in England